"Rhythm Is a Dancer" is a song by German Eurodance group Snap!, released in March 1992 as the second single from their second studio album, The Madman's Return (1992). It features vocals by American singer Thea Austin. The song is written by Benito Benites, John "Virgo" Garrett III (aliases for German producers Michael Münzing and Luca Anzilotti) and Austin, and produced by Benites and Garrett III. It was an international success, topping the charts in France, Ireland, Italy, Netherlands, Germany, and the United Kingdom. The single also reached the top-five on the US Billboard Hot 100 and number-one on the Billboard Dance Club Songs chart. It spent six weeks at the top of the UK Singles Chart, becoming the second biggest-selling single of 1992.

"Rhythm Is a Dancer" was originally not planned to be released as a single. Good club reactions to the track made Snap!'s German label, Logic, change their minds. Logic arranged a private test at its own discotheque, the Omen, to see how well the public responded to the new song. That's where the instant club appeal of "Rhythm Is a Dancer" first came to notice. Rapper Turbo B, who rejected the song when he first heard it, would go on to add a rap stanza to the track. Snap! won the 1992 Echo award for the Best Selling Single of the Year with "Rhythm Is a Dancer".

Lyrics and music
"Rhythm Is a Dancer" features vocals by Thea Austin, and the 7-inch version features a rap verse by Turbo B.

According to Miz hit. tubes, a book which analyses the French pop charts, "This discotheque song alternates female singing in the chorus with fluid, set black male raps in the verses. These are tinted with a resonant sonority, which gives them an astonishingly melancholic softness, for a dance hit. That gives the whole track a particular colour, almost nostalgia."

The rap lyrics on the album version (not the 7-inch version) are a slightly modified version of the following lines from an essay by John Perry Barlow called "Being in Nothingness: Virtual Reality and the Pioneers of Cyberspace" and were performed by studio engineer Daniel Iribarren.

The song was originally released as a bonus track on "The Madman's Return" CD, and did not appear on the initial vinyl release. The rap was replaced by Turbo B when it was decided that it would be released as the second single off of the record.

It also contains what one critic called the worst lyrics of all time, "I'm serious as cancer when I say rhythm is a dancer". The original album version of the song did not contain the line, which is found on the more widely known 7-inch version edit of the song that was later added to the album. The immediate reaction of Turbo B when presented with the line was reportedly 'No way am I singing that shit!' Although Snap! were criticized for the line and Turbo B later stated he hated it, the line had been used in hip hop music since the late 1980s.

"Rhythm Is a Dancer" contains the hook/riff sample from the 1984 song "Automan" by Newcleus, written in the key of A minor with a tempo of 124 beats per minute in common time. The song follows a chord progression of F–G–Am, and the vocals span from A3 to C5. The bassline groove repeats an A-F-G-A pattern with anticipation quavers. During the rap break the music hangs on Am/A chord/bass combination.

Critical reception
AllMusic picked "Rhythm Is a Dancer" as one of the "standout" tracks from The Madman's Return. Ken Capobianco from The Boston Globe complimented Thea Austin's "colorful" voice, adding that "everything gels" on the "intoxicating" track. German magazine Bunte deemed it "the mother of all Eurodance songs". Andy Kastanas from The Charlotte Observer called it "a Euro-house marvel that's not to be missed." Leah Greenblatt from Entertainment Weekly said the dance-floor anthem "became the stuff sweet Club MTV dreams were made of." Tom Ewing of Freaky Trigger noted its "stateliness and spaciousness" and described it as "higher minded, more spiritual". Dave Sholin from the Gavin Report wrote, "Two years ago, "The Power" dominated radio both here and abroad. Snap! kind of dropped out of sight since then, and they mark their return with a Euro-dance sound that's a mega-hit internationally. Sparks fly from start to finish." 

James Arena, writer of Stars of '90s Dance Pop: 29 Hitmakers Discuss Their Careers wrote, "From its distinctively electrifying opening chords to its powerful rolling beats, unusually poetic lyrical depth and robust vocals, "Rhythm Is a Dancer" (...) is one of the most recognizable success stories of the '90s." British newspaper Lennox Herald noted that the song is "more house oriented" than their previous hits. Alan Jones from Music Week said it is "their most commercial offering" since their debut single, adding that "it's also their most credible dance groove, and is sure to race into the Top 10." James Hamilton from the magazine's RM Dance Update noted the "Giorgio Moroder-ish buzzing synth". Eric McClary from Reno Gazette-Journal complimented it as "the quintessential rave track, with its fast, sharp-edged industrial beat." Tim Southwell from Smash Hits praised it, commenting, "Snap have gone back to their club roots here with a wonderfully infectious and simple dance shimmer which features Spanish guitars and a wispy choir vibe".

Chart performance
"Rhythm Is a Dancer" was the second single by Snap! to reach number-one in the United Kingdom, the single remained six weeks at the top position in 1992, from 2 August to 13 September. The single in 1992 has reached 583,000 sales in the UK. A massive hit across the world, it also topped the chart in Germany for ten weeks. In the United States, it peaked at number five in early 1993, and spent a total of 39 weeks on the Billboard Hot 100. In France, "Rhythm Is a Dancer" debuted at number five on 8 August 1992, before climbing to number-one four weeks later (where it stayed for six weeks). The song thus became the first dance single to hit the number-one position on the French Singles Chart. Additionally, the single also peaked at the number-one position in Austria, Belgium, Ireland, Israel, Italy, the Netherlands, Spain, Switzerland and Zimbabwe, as well as on the Eurochart Hot 100 and the RPM Dance/Urban chart in Canada. It earned a gold record in Australia, Austria, France, Italy, Sweden, and the US and a platinum record in Germany, the Netherlands, and the UK.

Snap! themselves re-recorded their own song in 1996 and 2003, the latter with CJ Stone (as "Rhythm is a Dancer 2003"). It reached number 17 on the UK Singles Chart in May 2003. On 25 May 2008, "Rhythm Is a Dancer" re-entered the UK Singles Chart at number 36, climbing as high as number 23 two weeks later. BBC Radio 1 DJs Fearne Cotton and Reggie Yates theorized it was based on download performance, due to its inclusion in a television advertisement for Drench water.

Music video
The accompanying music video for "Rhythm Is a Dancer" was directed by British director Howard Greenhalgh and premiered in July 1992. It was filmed at the Kennedy Space Center Visitor Complex in Florida, and shows singer Thea Austin, and Durron Butler (Turbo B) playing a bass guitar in the rocket garden, which is filled with smoke. Austin and her group perform the song on elevated platforms, while a group of dancers balanced their dance moves on a closed ground platform below them. Interspersed throughout these scenes are animated shots of flashing aviation maps, as well as animated figures balancing their dance moves. This was the last video to feature both Butler (Turbo B) and Austin before they left the group. The music video was later published on Snap!'s official YouTube channel in May 2011. It has amassed around 20 million views as of early 2022.

At the time of release, Montreal Gazette music critic Kathleen McCourt praised the video's "originality in costume and design" but wrote in disdain, "Don't waste your time with this clip." In 1994, Alf Björnberg wrote that the "video is manifestly non-narrative", that the visuals are music-reliant, and that the video's content is "not strongly structured by the visuals nor by the music".

Impact and legacy
In the 2017 book, Stars of 90's Dance Pop: 29 Hitmakers Discuss Their Careers by James Arena, singer Thea Austin said about the song, "I believe "Rhythm Is a Dancer" resonates so powerfully because it is spiritually and creatively blessed. The producers and I had amazing energy and great intent in our creative process. The melodies are hypnotic and make people feel good, like a nursery rhyme that people gravitate towards. The music is so unique in that there was and is no other song that sounds like "Rhythm Is a Dancer". To me, it was a perfect marriage of music and voice. (...) People wanted a song like that back then—something to kickstart their day, free them up. It was a time in life that people were being liberated, like in South Africa or for the LGBT community in the States, and the song represents that liberation for many people.

VH1 ranked "Rhythm Is a Dancer" number 36 in their list of "100 Greatest Dance Songs" in 2000. MTV Dance ranked the song number four in their list of "The 100 Biggest '90s Dance Anthems of All Time" in November 2011. In 2012, the track was chosen "Best Song of the Nineties" in the Nineties Top 99 on the Belgian Radio MNM for the fourth year in a row. BuzzFeed ranked it number 30 in their "The 101 Greatest Dance Songs Of the '90s" list in 2017.

The Guardian placed it as number 69 in their list of "The 100 greatest UK No 1s" in 2020, adding, "Dance-pop in the 90s often traded in profound melancholy – Haddaway’s What Is Love and Corona’s Rhythm of the Night being other classic examples – and Rhythm Is a Dancer is one of the saddest of all. With its gospel vocals and cathedral-ready chords, it makes raving feel like a serious spiritual quest rather than something to do on a Friday."

Writer of the 2020 book, Move Your Body (2 The 90s): Unlimited Eurodance, Juha Soininen wrote that "Rhythm Is a Dancer" would go on to be "as meaningful to eurodance as Donna Summer's I Feel Love was to the whole dance music genre."

Accolades

Track listing and formats

 7-inch vinyl single
 "Rhythm Is a Dancer" (7-inch Edit) – 3:41
 "Rhythm Is a Dancer" (Purple Hazed 7-inch Mix) – 4:31

 12-inch vinyl single
 "Rhythm Is a Dancer" (12-inch Mix) – 5:12
 "Rhythm Is a Dancer" (Purple Hazed Mix) – 6:49
 "See the Light" (Hard-Kick Family Version) – 7:05
 "See the Light" (Hypnotic Base Line Mix) – 7:07

 12-inch vinyl single – Remixes
 "Rhythm Is a Dancer" (Rhyth Kid Version) – 5:38
 "Rhythm Is a Dancer" (Tee's Choice Mix) – 6:19

 CD maxi single
 "Rhythm Is a Dancer" (7-inch edit) – 3:41
 "Rhythm Is a Dancer" (12-inch mix) – 5:12
 "Rhythm Is a Dancer" (Purple Hazed Mix) – 6:49

 CD maxi single – Remixes
 "Rhythm Is a Dancer" (Rhyth Kid Version) – 5:38
 "Rhythm Is a Dancer" (Tee's Choice Mix) – 6:19
 "Rhythm Is a Dancer" (Instrumental Rhythm) – 5:30

 CD single – 2003 remixes
 "Rhythm Is a Dancer 2003" (Radio Edit)
 "Rhythm Is a Dancer 2003" (CJ Stone Remix)
 "Rhythm Is a Dancer 2003" ('92)
 "Rhythm Is a Dancer 2003" (Video)

 CD maxi single – 2003 remixes
 "Rhythm Is a Dancer 2003" (Video Version) – 3:20
 "Rhythm Is a Dancer 2003" (CJ Stone Radio Mix) – 3:49
 "Rhythm Is a Dancer 2003" ("Check This Out" Remix) – 7:06
 "Rhythm Is a Dancer 2003" (CJ Stone Club Mix) – 7:45
 "Rhythm Is a Dancer" ('92) – 3:42

 UK and Europe CD maxi single – 2008 remixes
 "Rhythm Is a Dancer" (8-inch BB Mix) – 3:45
 "Rhythm Is a Dancer" (Tom Novy Remix) – 8:01
 "Rhythm Is a Dancer" (Original 12-inch) – 5:33

Charts and certifications

Weekly charts

Year-end charts

Decade-end charts

Certifications

Release history

Covers and interpolations
"Rhythm Is a Dancer", which itself sampled the beat from a 1984-song called "Automan" by American electro, synth and old-school hip hop band Newcleus, has been covered by numerous artists including German singer Key Biscayne (aka Lian Ross) in 1992, Italian radio host Leone di Lernia who recorded a parody of the song in Italian, Max Deejay who recorded an instrumental cover in 1997, System Drivers in 2002, The Superb, a Brazilian rock act produced by Chilean DJ Sokio in 2005, Israeli-Italian artist Sagi Rei for his 2005 album Emotional Songs, Chic Flowerz featuring Muriel Fowler in 2006. In 1993, Kids Incorporated covered the song in the Season 9 episode "Teamwork".

Bastille's 2013 single "Of the Night" was a mashup of "Rhythm Is a Dancer" and another 1990s dance classic, Corona's "The Rhythm of the Night".

German House DJ Damon Paul covered “Rhythm Is a Dancer”  featuring Simone Mangiapane, on his album of the same name in 2014, under the Sounds United label.

References

Snap! songs
1992 songs
1992 singles
1996 singles
2003 singles
2008 singles
Dutch Top 40 number-one singles
English-language German songs
European Hot 100 Singles number-one singles
Music videos directed by Howard Greenhalgh
Number-one singles in Austria
Number-one singles in Germany
Number-one singles in Israel
Number-one singles in Italy
Number-one singles in Switzerland
Number-one singles in Zimbabwe
SNEP Top Singles number-one singles
Songs about dancing
UK Singles Chart number-one singles